Enid Mirembe, is a Ugandan  beauty pageant contestant, who was crowned "Miss Tourism Busoga Region" on 26 July 2015. In 2016, she was named as one of "The 40 Movers and Shakers of 2016", by Satisfashion Uganda, a Ugandan fashion magazine.

Background and education
She was born in Bugiri District, in 1993. After attending local schools for her elementary and secondary school education, she was admitted to Makerere University, Uganda's largest and oldest public university. She graduated in 2016 with a Bachelor of Arts degree.

Career
While in her third year of undergraduate studies at Makerere University, she competed in the Miss Tourism Beauty Pageant, representing Busoga sub-region. The contest was organised by the Uganda Tourism Board and he Uganda Ministry of Tourism.

During her tenure, she organized what is called a "Rolex Festival". A rolex is a food item consisting of an egg omelette and vegetables wrapped in a chapati. Rolexes are consumed widely in many of Uganda's urban areas. The Festival consists of street vendors of this food preparing the food in large quantities on the street of the target city or town, with customers meandering through the cook-stations, sampling, buying and consuming as the mingle. Enid Mirembe continued to organize these festivals even after her tenure as the beauty queen expired.

See also
 Dora Mwima
 Patricia Akello

References

External links
Rolex Now Officially A Fast Food Tourist Attraction As of 22 August 2016.

Living people
1993 births
Makerere University alumni
People from Bugiri District
People from Eastern Region, Uganda
Ugandan beauty pageant contestants